Demand of Honor is a 1984 role-playing game adventure for Star Trek: The Role Playing Game published by FASA.

Plot summary
Demand of Honor is an adventure module set during the first five-year mission of the U.S.S. Enterprise, in which Starfleet tries to prevent Gorn pirates from attacking Federation shipping.

Reception
Bob Mosley III reviewed Demand of Honor in Space Gamer No. 75. Mosley commented that "Depending on what kind of players the GM is working with, this could either be a single afternoon adventure or the beginning of a galactic war campaign. On the same note, it's up to the GM to do whatever possible to guide the players to a solution that won't produce a war – that is, unless the GM wants a war with the Gorns. If that is the case, then this is the perfect module to start it off."

References

Role-playing game supplements introduced in 1984
Star Trek: The Role Playing Game adventures